Tectarius antonii is a species of sea snail, a marine gastropod mollusc in the family Littorinidae, the winkles or periwinkles.

Description 
The maximum recorded shell length is 21 mm.

Distribution
This species occurs in the Gulf of Mexico, the Caribbean Sea and the Lesser Antilles.

Habitat 
Minimum recorded depth is -2 m. Maximum recorded depth is 0 m.

References

 Reid, D.G. (1989) The comparative morphology, phylogeny and evolution of the gastropod family Littorinidae. Philosophical Transactions of the Royal Society of London, Series B 324: 1–110.
 Rosenberg, G., F. Moretzsohn, and E. F. García. 2009. Gastropoda (Mollusca) of the Gulf of Mexico, Pp. 579–699 in Felder, D.L. and D.K. Camp (eds.), Gulf of Mexico–Origins, Waters, and Biota. Biodiversity. Texas A&M Press, College Station, Texas

Littorinidae
Gastropods described in 1846